Cù-Lao Ré is a volcanic field northeast of Quảng Ngãi, Vietnam. The field consists of 13 volcanic cones; four subaerial and nine submarine. Three of the subaerial cones formed the Cù-Lao Ré Island, while the fourth one formed the Cù-Lao Bai Island. The islands form the Lý Sơn District of Quảng Ngãi Province.

See also
List of volcanoes in Vietnam

References

Volcanoes of Vietnam
Islands of Vietnam
Landforms of Quảng Ngãi province